The 2019–20 season was the 114th season in the existence of Spezia Calcio and the club's eighth consecutive in the second division of Italian football. In addition to the domestic league, Spezia participated in this season's edition of the Coppa Italia.

Players

First-team squad
.

Out on loan

Competitions

Overview

Serie B

League table

Results summary

Results by round

Matches

Promotion play-offs

Coppa Italia

Statistics

Goalscorers

References

External links

Spezia Calcio seasons
Spezia Calcio